Stephen Kelly (born December 20, 1950) is an American sprint canoer who competed in the early to mid-1970s. At the 1972 Summer Olympics in Munich, he was eliminated in the repechages of the K-4 1000 m event. Four years later in Montreal, Kelly was eliminated in the repechages of the same event.  He was also selected four years later to compete in the [ [Moscow] ] Olympics which was boycotted by the United States.  In 1996, he was selected to become the Canoeing Competition Manager for the [ [Atlanta] ] Olympic Games.

References
Sports-reference.com profile

1944 births
American male canoeists
Canoeists at the 1972 Summer Olympics
Canoeists at the 1976 Summer Olympics
Living people
Olympic canoeists of the United States